The Jackson Area Transportation Authority is the primary provider of mass transportation in Jackson County, Michigan. Ten Routes provide service from Monday through Saturday.

Route list
1 East Michigan Avenue
2 West Michigan Avenue
3 Southwest Avenue
4 Cooper Street
5 Lansing Avenue
6 Francis Street
7 West Ganson Street
8 Jackson College/DaVinci
9 Blackman Loop
10 Soper Line

External links
 Website

Bus transportation in Michigan
Jackson, Michigan
Transportation in Jackson County, Michigan